Benjamin Markovits is a British-American writer. He is the author of seven novels, among them a trilogy on the life of Lord Byron. He was selected as one of the Best of Young British Novelists by Granta magazine in 2013. In 2016, his novel You Don't Have To Live Like This won the James Tait Black Prize for Fiction.

Markovits grew up in Texas, London and Berlin, and studied at Yale University and the University of Oxford. After college, he played professional basketball in Landshut, Germany, for a team in the southern league of the German second division. He now lives in London, where he teaches creative writing at Royal Holloway, University of London.

Bibliography
 2004: The Syme Papers
 2005: Either Side of Winter
 2007: Imposture
 2008: A Quiet Adjustment
 2010: Playing Days: A Novel
 2011: Childish Loves
 2015: You Don't Have to Live Like This
 2018: A Weekend in New York
 2019: Christmas in Austin

Awards and recognition
 2006: Le Prince Maurice Prize
 2009: Fellowship, Radcliffe Centre for Humanities
 2013: Granta Best of Young British Novelists
 2016: James Tait Black Prize for Fiction

References

British writers
Year of birth missing (living people)
Living people